To Catch a Thief is a 1955 romantic thriller film based on the novel.

To Catch a Thief may also refer to:

 To Catch a Thief (novel), a 1952 thriller novel by David F. Dodge
 To Catch a Thief (1936 film), a 1936 British comedy film 
 "To Catch a Thief" (short story), a 1901 short story by E. W. Hornung
 To Catch a Thief (Once Upon a Time in Wonderland), an episode of the TV series Once Upon a Time in Wonderland